Smilga may refer to:

Smilga (river), Lithuania

Surname 
 Ivan Smilga (Jānis Smilga) (1898-1918), Soviet Latvian soldier buried in the Kremlin Wall Necropolis
 Ivar Smilga (1892–1938), Soviet Bolshevik leader
 Kārlis Smilga (born 1975), Latvian curler
 Vineta Smilga, Latvian curler, see 2010 European Curling Championships – Women's tournament